Darcy Wallingford is a Canadian former swimmer of the 1980s.

A breaststroke specialist from Sudbury, Ontario, Wallingford featured at the 1986 World Championships in Madrid, where he placed 21st in the 100 m breaststroke. He swam heats for the gold medal-winning  relay team at the 1986 Commonwealth Games in Edinburgh and won three medals at the 1987 Pan American Games in Indianapolis.

Wallingford's father Ron was a noted distance runner and he has a son Keon who also competes in running events.

References

External links

Year of birth missing (living people)
Living people
Canadian male breaststroke swimmers
Sportspeople from Greater Sudbury
Swimmers at the 1986 Commonwealth Games
Medallists at the 1986 Commonwealth Games
Commonwealth Games gold medallists for Canada
Commonwealth Games medallists in swimming
Swimmers at the 1987 Pan American Games
Medalists at the 1987 Pan American Games
Pan American Games medalists in swimming
Pan American Games silver medalists for Canada
Pan American Games bronze medalists for Canada